Theophilus Beebe III (October 19, 1800January 9, 1867) was a 19th-century American Sandy Hook Pilot. He was the first pilot to receive his pilot's license under the New Jersey Pilots' Commission in 1837. Beebe served as pilot on the pilot boat Thomas H Smith. He died on January 9, 1867, in Jersey City, New Jersey.

Early life

Theophilus Beebe was born on October 19, 1880, in New London, Connecticut. He was the son of Theophilus D. Beebe (1753–1837) and Lucy Monroe (1755–1830), who was a direct descendant of President James Monroe. 

Beebe married Elizabeth Van Gelder (1804–1866) in Brooklyn, New York in 1825 and had eight children. One of his sons, James D. M. Beebe, was a Sandy Hook pilot. Theophilus's grandson, Charles O. Beebe was also a Sandy Hook pilot, making the family name associated with Maritime pilots for 100 years.

One of his brothers was Clinton Beebe, born in 1812, had two sons that were in the Sandy Hook service: George W. Beebe (1865–1931) and Franklin B. Beebe (1864–1908). 

His nephew, George W. Beebe, was a license pilot for forty years. He was one of the first presidents of the New York Pilots' Association. He was the author of the "Beebe's Tides and Complete River Guide of New York Harbor." George died on April 8, 1931, at the age of sixty-seven from heart disease.

Career

Captain Theophilus Beebe was commissioned by the governor of New Jersey to procure men qualified to become pilots. He was the first pilot to receive his branch pilot's license under the New Jersey Pilots' Commission on February 25, 1837. His brothers, Lyman Beebe and Clinton Beebe, received their pilot's license at this time. Beebe was a fisherman by trade and ran a small fishing smack out of Fulton Fish Market, New York City by way of the Sandy Hook, until the State of New Jersey built him a pilot boat.

Theophilus Beebe served as pilot on the pilot boat Thomas H Smith, along with Richard Brown, John Ward, Benjamin Chase, Henry Beebe, and Daniel C. Chapman.

Death

Theophilus Beebe died, at age 66, of heart disease on the pilot boat Mystic, on January 9, 1867, in Jersey City, New Jersey. He is buried in the Green-wood Cemetery in Brooklyn, New York.

See also
List of Northeastern U. S. Pilot Boats

References

 

Maritime pilotage
Sea captains
People from New London, Connecticut
1800 births
1867 deaths